A bard is a minstrel in medieval Scottish, Irish, and Welsh societies; and later re-used by romantic writers.

Bard, BARD, Bård or similar terms may also refer to:

People 
Bard (surname)
Bård, Norwegian given name and surname

"The Bard of..." etc. 
William Shakespeare (died 1616), the Bard of Avon or the Bard
Robert Burns (1759–1796), the Bard of Ayrshire or the Bard
Rabindranath Tagore (1861–1941), the Bard of Bengal
John Cooper Clarke (born 1949), the Bard of Salford
Richard Llwyd (1752–1835), the Bard of Snowdon
Thomas Rowley (poet) (1721–1796), the Bard of the Green Mountains
Robert W. Service (1874–1958), the Bard of the Yukon
Alasdair mac Mhaighstir Alasdair ( 1698–1770), the Great Bard

Fictional characters 
Bard the Bowman, a character from J. R. R. Tolkien's novel The Hobbit
Beedle the Bard, an author of fairy tales in the Harry Potter series

Places

In the United States
Bard Peak (Alaska), a summit in the Kenai Mountains
Bard, California, an unincorporated community
Bard, Nevada, a ghost town
Bard, New Mexico, an unincorporated community
Bard Peak, Colorado, United States

In Iran
Bard, Ardabil, Ardabil Province
Bard, Iran, Mazandaran Province, a village
Bard Gapi, Izeh County, Khuzestan Province, a village 
Bard Kheymeh, Ramhormoz County, Khuzestan Province, a village 
Bard-e Ghamchī, Andika County, Khuzestan Province, a village

Elsewhere
Bard Island, Newfoundland and Labrador, Canada
Bard, Loire, France
Bard, Aosta Valley, Italy
Fort Bard

Music
Bard (Soviet Union), genre of music in Russia consisting of singers-songwriters with guitar accompaniment
The Bard (Sibelius), a tone poem by Jean Sibelius
Bard (album), an album by Big Big Train
Blind Guardian or the Bards, a power metal/speed metal band
Bardcore, medievalised remakes of hit pop songs

Literature
Bard: The Odyssey of the Irish, a novel by Morgan Llywelyn
Bard, a series of novels by Keith Taylor
The Bard, a poem by Thomas Gray

In role-playing and video games
Bard (Dungeons & Dragons), a character class in Dungeons & Dragons and the Pathfinder Roleplaying Game
Bard, a character class in the Final Fantasy series
Bard, a class in Vanguard: Saga of Heroes
Bard, the Wandering Caretaker, a champion in League of Legends
The Bard, a playable character class in Everquest

Schools
Bard College, Annandale-on-Hudson, New York, United States
Bard College at Simon's Rock, an "early college" in Great Barrington, Massachusetts, United States
Bard High School Early College, an alternative public secondary school in New York City, United States
Bard College Berlin, Germany, a private, non-profit institution of higher education

Other uses
Bard (chatbot), a chatbot developed by Google
Bangladesh Academy for Rural Development, Comilla, Bangladesh
BARD Offshore 1, a wind farm by BARD Engineering Gmbh
Barding or bard, armour for horses
The Bard (American horse), a racehorse
The Bard (British horse), a racehorse
"The Bard" (The Twilight Zone), an episode
BARDS, Broadband Acoustic Resonance Dissolution Spectroscopy
C. R. Bard, Inc., a manufacturer of medical equipment